The Talaang Ginto (Golden List), formerly known as the “Talaang Ginto: Gawad Surian sa Tula-Gantimpalang Tamayo” (Golden List: Institute Award-Tamayo Prize), is a sought-after annual literary award in Philippine poetry.  The Talaang Ginto is perhaps the longest-running state-run literary contest that began in 1963 by the Surian ng Wikang Pambansa (Institute of National Language).  The Surian was later replaced by the Komisyon sa Wikang Filipino in 1991. The Commission organizes the contest at present.

History 

For 25 years, since 1984, the contest was supported by the Jorge Collantes Foundation, which gave the award its other name, Gantimpalang Collantes or Collantes Prize.  In 2009, the Tamayo Foundation took over, and the award was renamed, Gantimpalang Tamayo or Tamayo Prize.

The Talaang Ginto annually gives six awards for poetry in Filipino, three major prizes, and three honorable mentions.  The recipient of the first prize is automatically proclaimed as the Makata ng Taon or “Poet of the Year,” and delivers a valedictory response during the awarding ceremonies.

The Talaang Ginto is held every April 2 to celebrate the birth of the Philippines’ foremost poet, Francisco Balagtas.

Makata ng Taon Honorees 
2022

Paterno Buban Baloloy Jr.
2021

Paolo Miguel Gamboa Tiausas

2020

Karl Ivan Dan V. Orit

2019

Michael Jude C. Tumamac
2018
Christian Jil R. Benitez
2017
Aldrin P. Pentero
2016
Mark Anthony S. Angeles
2015
Christian Ray P. Pilares
2014
Ezzard R. Gilbang
2013 
Joselito Delos Reyes
2012 
Alvin C. Ursua
2011 
Louie Jon Agustin Sanchez
2010 
David Michael M. San Juan
2009 
Louie Jon Agustin Sanchez
2008
Reuel Molina Aguila
2007

Genaro R. Gojo Cruz
2006
Louie Jon Agustin Sanchez
2005
Jerry B. Gracio
2004
Genaro R. Gojo Cruz
2003
Nestor A. Barco
2002
Carlos Guevarra Payongayong
2001
Maribel G. Bagabaldo
2000
Eugene Y. Evasco
1999
Tomas F. Agulto
1998
Reynaldo A. Duque
1997
Tomas F. Agulto
1996
Ariel Dim. Borlongan
1995
Ariel Dim. Borlongan
1994
Niles Jordan D. Breis
1993
Cirilo F. Bautista
1992
Ruth Elynia S. Mabanglo
1991
Rowena F. Festin
1990
Ariel N. Valerio
1989
Lilia Quindoza Santiago
1988
Tomas F. Agulto
1987
Fidel D. Rillo. Jr.
1986
Mike L. Bigornia
1985
Victor Emmanuel Carmelo D. Nadera
1984
Virgilio S. Almario
1983
Flor Condino Gonzales
1982
Pedro L. Ricarte
1981
Edmundo Libid
1980
Lamberto E. Antonio
1979
Jesus Manuel Santiago
1978
Jesus Manuel Santiago
1977
Galeny G. Topacio-Manalaysay
1976
Teo T. Antonio
1975
Romulo A. Sandoval
1974
Isaias Villaflores
1973
Aurelio G. Angeles
1972
(no winner proclaimed)
1971
Ramon H. Belen
1970
(no contest held)
1969
Rogelio G. Mangahas
1968
Victor S. Fernandez
1967
Celestino M. Vega
1966
Federico Licsi Espino
1965
Vict. V. dela Cruz
1964
Teo S. Baylen
1963
Bienvenido A. Ramos

References

Philippine literary awards
Awards established in 1963